The 2014 Curlers Corner Autumn Gold Curling Classic was held from October 10 to 13 at the Calgary Curling Club in Calgary, Alberta. The event was the first women's Grand Slam of the 2014–15 World Curling Tour. The event was a triple knockout format, and the purse for the event was CAD$50,000.

The reigning Olympic champion Jennifer Jones rink from Winnipeg defeated the reigning Canadian champion Rachel Homan rink from Ottawa in the final. The win gave Jones a record 11th career Grand Slam title.

Teams
The teams are listed as follows:

Knockout results
The draw is listed as follows:

A event

B event

C event

Playoffs

References

External links

Autumn Gold Curling Classic
2014 in Canadian curling
2014 in Alberta
October 2014 sports events in Canada
2014 in women's curling